V. M. Devadas (born March 1981) is a Malayalam novelist, short story writer and screenwriter from Wadakkancherry, Kerala, India.

List of works

Novels
 Dildo: Aaru Maranangalude Pulp Fiction Patapusthakam (Palghat: Logos, 2009)
 Pannivetta (Trivandrum: Chintha, 2010)
 Cheppum Panthum (Kottayam:DC Books, 2017)
 Eru (Kottayam:DC Books, 2021)

Short story collections
Marana Sahayi (Kottayam:DC Books, 2011)
Salabha Jeevitham (Trivandrum: Chintha, 2014)
Avanavan Thuruthu (Kottayam:DC Books, 2016)
Vazhi Kanupidikkunnavar (Calicut: Mathrubhumi, 2018)
Kadinu Nadukkoru Maram (Kottayam:DC Books, 2021)
Katha (Kottayam: S.P.C.S., 2021)

Screenwriter

Awards
 2010: Malayala Manorama Novel Carnival Award – Pannivetta
 2011: Nooranad Haneef Memorial Award – Pannivetta
 2011: Chandrika Katha Puraskaram – Tibet (Story)
2015 : Ettumanoor Kavya Vedhi Puraskaram – SalabhaJeevitham
2016 : Kerala Sahitya Akademi's Geetha Hiranyan Endowment Award 2014 – MaranaSahayi 
2016 - Mazhavil Sahitya Puraskaram – Chaavusakshyam
 2017 – Ankanam Sahitya Puraskaram – SalabhaJeevitham
 2017 – Manoraj KathaSamahara Puraskaram – Avanavan Thuruthu
 2017 – C.V Sreeraman Smrithi Puraskaram – Avanavan Thuruthu
 2017 – Yes Press Books Novel Award – Cheppum Panthum
 2018 – Five Continents International Film Festival – Best Drama Short Film – Nadakantham
 2018 – Muthukulam Raghavan Pillai award for best short film script at K.P.A.C International Fim Fest – Nadakantham
 2018 – Karur Neelakanta Pillai Smaraka Katha Puraskaram – Panthirukulam
 2018 – Swami Vivekananda Yuva Prathibha Award instituted by the Kerala State Youth Welfare Board – Avanavan Thuruthu
2018 – K.V. Sudhakaran Katha Puraskaram – Avanavan Thuruthu
2019 – Vaikom Muhammad Basheer Malayala Padhanakendram Award – Cheppum Panthum
2019 – D Sreeman Namboothiri Sahithya Puraskaram – Cheppum Panthum
2021 – K.A. Kodungallur Madhyamam Sahitya Puraskaram - Keezhkkamthookku
2022 – Thoppil Ravi Smaraka Sahithya Puraskaram - Eru
2022 – Kerala Sahitya Akademi Award for Story Collection - Vazhi Kandupidikkunnavar
2023 – O. V. Vijayan Literary Award - Kadinu Nadukkoru Maram

External links

References

1981 births
People from Thrissur district
Screenwriters from Kerala
Malayalam-language writers
Malayalam novelists
Malayalam short story writers
21st-century Indian novelists
Living people
21st-century Indian short story writers
Indian male short story writers
21st-century Indian male writers
Novelists from Kerala
21st-century Indian screenwriters